is the 38th single by Japanese singer/songwriter Chisato Moritaka. Written by Moritaka and Shin Kōno, the single was released by zetima on March 17, 1999. The song was used by Kirin for their Naturals smoothies commercials.

Chart performance 
"Watashi no Yō ni" peaked at No. 37 on Oricon's singles chart and sold 11,000 copies.

Other versions 
Moritaka re-recorded the song and uploaded the video on her YouTube channel on September 28, 2013. This version is also included in Moritaka's 2014 self-covers DVD album Love Vol. 5.

Track listing

Personnel 
 Chisato Moritaka – vocals, drums
 Yuichi Takahashi – acoustic guitar, synthesizer programming
 Shin Kōno – Fender Rhodes, acoustic guitar
 Cornell Dupree – guitar
 Yukio Seto – guitar

Chart positions

References

External links 
 
 
 

1999 singles
1999 songs
Japanese-language songs
Chisato Moritaka songs
Songs with lyrics by Chisato Moritaka
Zetima Records singles